Waban station is a surface-level light rail station on the Massachusetts Bay Transportation Authority's Green Line D branch, located just south of Beacon Street at Waban Square in the Waban section of Newton, Massachusetts. The station is located below grade; access to both platforms is via Wyman Street on the outbound side of the tracks or a stairway from Beacon Street. Waban is not accessible.

History

Waban formerly boasted an H.H. Richardson-designed train station, like those still standing in Newton Highlands and Newton Centre. The original station was completed in August 1886 as part of the Boston and Albany Railroad's Highland branch and was one of the last stations designed by Richardson before his death in April 1886.

Waban closed along with the rest of the Highland branch commuter rail line in 1958 and reopened on July 4, 1959, as part of the light rail D branch. The H. H. Richardson station was demolished in order to build a 57-space parking lot.

The station has two MBTA ticket machines for reloading stored-value CharlieCards and buying CharlieTickets, as well one fare validation machine. All three are enclosed in a heated passenger shed near the center of the inbound platform. On May 28, 2008, two westbound Green Line trains collided between Waban and Woodland, killing one person.

In 2019, the MBTA indicated that the four remaining non-accessible stops on the D branch were "Tier I" accessibility priorities. A preliminary design contract for accessibility modifications at the four stations was issued in February 2021. Design reached 75% in June 2022 and was completed late that year. Construction was expected to be advertised in February 2023 and begin midyear.

References

External links

MBTA - Waban
 Beacon Street entrance from Google Maps Street View

Green Line (MBTA) stations
Railway stations in Middlesex County, Massachusetts
Former Boston and Albany Railroad stations
Railway stations in the United States opened in 1959